Emma Christina Wikén (born 1 May 1989) is a Swedish cross-country skier who competes in the cross-country World Cup. During the Swedish championships in skiathlon in Falun 2013, Wikén won gold. At the 2014 Winter Olympics, Wikén won gold in the 4 × 5 km relay along with Ida Ingemarsdotter, Anna Haag and Charlotte Kalla.

Cross-country skiing results
All results are sourced from the International Ski Federation (FIS).

Olympic Games
 1 medal – (1 gold)

World Championships
 1 medal – (1 silver)

World Cup

Season standings

Team podiums
 1 podium – (1 )

References

External links

 
 
 

1989 births
Swedish female cross-country skiers
Cross-country skiers at the 2014 Winter Olympics
Olympic cross-country skiers of Sweden
Tour de Ski skiers
Medalists at the 2014 Winter Olympics
Olympic medalists in cross-country skiing
Olympic gold medalists for Sweden
People from Berg Municipality
Living people
Åsarna IK skiers
21st-century Swedish women